Frederick Leonard may refer to:
Frederick Leonard (actor), Nigerian actor
Frederick Leonard (activist), American civil rights activist
Frederick C. Leonard (1896–1960), American astronomer
Fred Churchill Leonard (1856–1921), American politician